Ishaan Dev better known as shaan is an Indian music composer, singer-songwriter, multi-instrumentalist, music programmer and stage performer in several South Indian languages.
Hailing from Thiruvallam, Trivandrum, Kerala, India, Ishaan Dev worked in several South Indian languages. He won the Best Male Playback Singer Award at Mirchi Music Awards South for the Kannada Movie Shyloo in 2011. He had composed and recorded songs for several South Indian movies and established himself an identity as a musician in the industry. He is the composer and singer of the famous song, during the 2018 flooding in Kerala ‘Karalurappulla Keralam’ which gained special attention all across the nation.

Early and Personal Life

 
Ishaan Dev always aspired to become a singer from an early age. He is always influenced by his father who is well-versed in Carnatic Music. At the age of three, he started learning Carnatic Music under the guidance of his father. Since then, he had the privilege to get guidance and formal training in Carnatic Music from several respected teachers. Ishaan believes that there is no end to learning music. He also receives formal training in Carnatic Music under the guidance of respected Dr. Sri. Cherthala Renganatha Sharma and Dr. Sri. Chandra Babu Sir. He is also being trained in Western Music by Sri. Augustin Paul sir. In 2009, Ishaan Dev married the love of his life Jeena Shaan and they have 2 beautiful kids aged 8 and 3 respectively. He has a studio Music ID records based in Chennai. Ishaan is currently in Trivandrum, Kerala, India.

Career 
 
Ishaan Dev had a breakthrough while he was studying at the University College, Trivandrum in Kerala. He always mentioned his respect and gratitude to The Violin Maestro, Sri. Late Balabhaskar, who was also studying at the University College at the same time, and his tremendous support and influence on Ishaan’s musical journey. Several times, Ishaan mentioned the Violin Maestro Sri. Late Balabhaskar is not only a teacher but also like his own brother. At the age of 17, Ishaan Dev and The Violin Maestro Sri. Late Balabhaskar and a few of their friends started the first Boy Band in Kerala called Con-Fusion. The First Boy Band was a huge hit and they jointly worked on the album Neeyariyan in which Ishaan Dev was the lead Singer. The songs ‘ Aaru Nee’, ‘ En Nenjile’, and ‘Naye Zamane ki Gana’ received huge praises. Since 2005, Ishaan has worked in the Malayalam film industry. His theme song for the Malayalam movie ‘The Tiger’ released in 2005 and ‘Chinthamani Kolacase’ in 2006 claimed huge praises and the general public still remembers the theme songs. Ever since He has worked on several original soundtracks and background scores in various south Indian languages. Ishaan also made his debut as a playback singer in 2004 with the song ‘Ponveyil Naalam’ in the Malayalam movie Panchajanyam, composed by the late Sri. Balabhaskar. He worked as a Playback singer in several Malayalam and Kannada movies since then. In 2011, Ishaan won the Mirchi Music Awards South for the best playback male singer for the song Shyloo from the Kannada movie Shyloo.

 
In one of his interviews, Ishaan mentioned that his goal was to become a singer in a band. He achieved that goal and anything beyond what he received is all because of his passion for music. He tells his well-wishers that music has no limits and one should always be open to learning more. He upholds that in life.

 
Ishaan worked with the famous Music Composer and Playback singer Sri. Jassie Gift for the ever-famous song “Lajjavathiye” in the film 4 the people. Ishaan’s contribution to several albums and devotional songs is immense.

He has done several cover songs which have become a huge hit among the public. He also performed in several stage shows and also performed at Kappa Music Mojo where he gained much attention. Ishaan’s Version of the ‘Thaarapadham’ Song became quite a hit among the public. One of his famous cover versions is ‘Kaathil thenmazha’.
 
Being a music composer, Ishaan Dev composed and sang ‘Karalurappulla Keralam’ which became a huge success receiving a million views. The whole State of Kerala took the song to heart during the difficult times of 2018 flooding and COVID-19 and received special attention from the Chief Minister of Kerala Sri. Pinarayi Vijayan. Ishaan also worked with the famous Playback singer Shreya Ghoshal, composing the song ‘Iravil Varugire’ from the Tamil Movie ‘En Aaloda Seruppa Kaanom’. The audio rights of this movie are owned by Ondraga Entertainments, under the ownership of the Famous Indian director and producer, Sri. Gautham Vasudev Menon. Ishaan’s contributions to the musical field have been immense and he continues his musical journey exploring, learning, and promoting World music and his passion for music on many levels and platforms.

Discography

As playback singer

Albums

See also
Mirchi Music Awards South

References

External links
 
http://cineinfotv.com/new-music-director-appreciated-by-kalaipuli-s-thanu/
http://www.chennaipatrikatv.com/post/2016/05/02/Music-Director-Ishaan-Dev-impresses-Kalaipuli-S-Thanu.aspx 
http://www.thehindu.com/features/cinema/let-the-music-flow/article3892780.ece
http://www.behindwoods.com/tamil-movies-cinema-news-16/producer-thanu-praises-ishaan-dev-the-new-music-composer.html
http://www.ritzmagazine.in/new-kid-in-kollywoods-music-block/

Indian male musicians
Living people
Musicians from Chennai
Tamil film score composers
Malayalam film score composers
Kannada playback singers
Malayalam playback singers
Indian male playback singers
Male film score composers
Year of birth missing (living people)